Also refers to Amman Industrial Estate, and King Abdullah Industrial City.

It is located within the city of Sahab. Its total area comprises 2.5 million square meters. By mid-1998, the Industrial City of Sahab accommodated 354 medium and small industries employing more than 13,700 workers. Within the Industrial City of Sahab, there are 78 foreign, Arab and joint-venture industries.

Land and building facilities are available for purchase or rent at concessionary prices. The Industrial City of Sahab also provides the following privileges to industries operating on their premises:

Enterprises operating in industrial estates are exempted from income and social services taxes for a period of two years from the commencement of operations.
Projects operating in industrial estates are exempted from land and building taxes throughout the lifespan of the project.

The Industrial City of Sahab is nearly fully occupied and due to numerous demands by new investors, the Jordan Industrial Estate Corporation is in the process of developing an area of 202,000 square meters adjacent to the Estate which is expected to be completed by the end of 1998.

Populated places in Jordan